Gunhilda of Wenden was a Polish princess, daughter of Mieszko I of Poland according to Chronicles of Thietmar of Merserburg, Adam von Bremen and Acta Cnutonis regis princess and Danish Viking Age queen consort, the supposed spouse of 10th-century King Sweyn I of Denmark (c. 960–1014). The sources about the wife or wives of Sweyn are contradictory (he is also said to have been married to Sigrid the Haughty), and historians have debated the whether she is the Polish Świętosława given another name in Norse sources.

Heimskringla 
In the 13th century collection of sagas, Heimskringla, Snorri Sturluson tells that Sweyn Forkbeard was captured in an attack on the Jomsvikings, and turned over to Burislav, king of Wenden. As part of their negotiations, it was agreed that Sweyn would marry Gunhild, the daughter of Burislav, while the latter would marry Sweyn's sister Tyri. By Gunhild, Sweyn is said to have had Harald II of Denmark and Cnut the Great. While this account agrees with certain aspects of the historical record, there are also differences.

Chroniclers
There is scant material in medieval chronicles to provide details regarding the marriages of Sweyn of Denmark:

Thietmar of Merseburg mentions that the daughter of Mieszko I of Poland and sister of Bolesław I of Poland married Sweyn Forkbeard and gave him sons Cnut and Harold, but he does not mention her name.  Thietmar is probably the best informed of all medieval chroniclers, since he was contemporary with described events and well-informed about the events in Poland and Denmark. The assertion that Harald and Cnut's mother was Bolesław's sister may explain some mysterious statements that appear in medieval chronicles, such as the involvement of Polish troops in invasions of England.
Adam of Bremen writes that a Polish princess was the wife of Eric the Victorious and by this marriage the mother of Olof Skötkonung of Sweden.  In her second marriage with Sweyn, she became mother of Cnut and Harold of Denmark.  Consequently, Adam calls Cnut and Olof brothers. Some historians consider Adam's account unreliable, because he is the only source to state this relationship.
Gesta Cnutonis regis mentions in one short passage that Cnut and his brother went to the land of the Slavs, and brought back their mother, who was living there. This does not necessarily mean that his mother was Slavic, but nevertheless this chronicle strongly suggests that she was.
There is an inscription in "Liber vitae of the New Minster and Hyde Abbey Winchester", that king Cnut's sister's name was "Santslaue" ("Santslaue soror CNVTI regis nostri"), which without doubt is a Slavic name. J. Steenstrup suggests that Canute's sister may have been named after her mother, hence coining (the now generally agreed upon) hypothesis, that her Old Polish name is Świętosława, but only as a reconstruction based on a single mention of her daughter's name and the hypothesis that she named her daughter after herself.

Identities
Several alternative interpretations of these data have been proposed. Gunhild might be identical to the historical wife of Sweyn. Further, the dual marriage reported by Adam of Bremen matches the Heimskringla account of Sigrid the Haughty. This may represent confusion between two wives, or it could be that Sigrid is a confused duplicate memory of the same historical wife.  This would mean that the woman called Gunhild in the sagas was Eric's widow, as several historians have concluded.  Finally, it is possible that Gunhild is simply a legendary invention, not directly based on Sweyn's known Polish wife.

References

External links 
 

Danish royal consorts
Gunnilda 0986
Norwegian royal consorts
10th-century births
Polish princesses
Year of death unknown
Piast dynasty
10th-century Polish people
11th-century Polish people
10th-century Polish women
11th-century Polish women
10th-century Danish people
11th-century Danish people
10th-century Danish women
11th-century Danish women
10th-century Norwegian people
11th-century Norwegian people
10th-century Norwegian women
11th-century Norwegian women
10th-century Swedish people
11th-century Swedish people
10th-century Swedish women
11th-century Swedish women
10th-century English people
11th-century English people
10th-century English women
11th-century English women